I Married a Centerfold is a 1984 American made-for-television comedy film starring Teri Copley and Tim Daly.

Plot summary
An engineer falls in love with a centerfold model he sees on television and sets out to win a bet with his friends that he will marry her.

Cast
 Teri Copley	as	Debra Bryan
 Tim Daly	as	Kevin Coates (credited as Timothy Daly)
 Diane Ladd	as	Jeanette Bryan
 Todd Susman	as	Bill Bodell
 Robert Hanley	as	Evans
 Anson Williams	as 	Nick Bellows
 Bert Remsen	as	Gramps
 Roger Aaron Brown	as Bob Waters
 Richard Jamison	as	Ernie Kreeger
 Suzanne LaRusch	as	Dolly
 Jack Fletcher	as	Daniel McDay 
 Robbi Morgan	as 	Kitty Selver
 Joe Estevez	as	Reporter (credited as Joseph Phelan) 
 Robert Pastorelli	as 	Guard

References

External links

1984 films
1984 television films
1980s English-language films
NBC network original films
Films scored by Mark Snow
Films about pornography
Films directed by Peter Werner